Peter Glover (born 1936) is an English former professional footballer who played as a right half.

Career
Born in Thackley, Glover played for Bradford City between November 1957 and February 1958, making 1 appearances in the Football League.

Sources

References

1936 births
Living people
English footballers
Bradford City A.F.C. players
English Football League players
Association football wing halves